Coenoptychus is a genus of African and Asian corinnid sac spiders first described by Eugène Simon in 1885.  it contains only three species, two of which were transferred from Graptartia in 2018.

References

Corinnidae
Araneomorphae genera
Spiders of Asia
Taxa named by Eugène Simon